Brephoscotosia is a genus of moths in the family Geometridae.  It is considered a synonym of Obila.

Species
 Brephoscotosia catocalaria (Walker, [1866])

References
 Brephoscotosia at Markku Savela's Lepidoptera and Some Other Life Forms

Larentiinae